Stephanospora is a genus of gasteroid fungi in the family Stephanosporaceae (order: Russulales). , Index Fungorum lists six species in the genus; nine new Australasian species were described in 2014 from collections previously thought to represent S. flava.

Taxonomy
Stephanospora was circumscribed by French mycologist Narcisse Théophile Patouillard in 1914 with S. caroticolor (formerly classified as a species of Hydnangium) as the type species.

Species

Natural compounds
The "carrot truffle", Stephanospora caroticolor, contains the compound stephanosporin, a 2-chloro-4-nitrophenol precursor. The compound, which gives the fruitbody its orange colour, converts to the toxic 2-chloro-4-nitrophenolate when the fruitbody is injured.

References

External links

Russulales
Russulales genera
Taxa named by Narcisse Théophile Patouillard
Taxa described in 1914